The Gautam Rajputs is a Rajput clan found in the Indian states of Uttar Pradesh, Bihar  and Madhya Pradesh. Jodha Singh Attaiya a great chieftain during Indian rebellion of 1857 also belongs to this ancient clan.

History
Some people fought for Sher Shah Suri (otherwise known as Sher Khan) against Humayun in the 16th century. By the time of Aurangzeb's reign, the Gautam Rajputs had gained enough strength to field armed contingents including artillery, horse cavalry and elephants and made incursions against the neighboring Bhumihars of Gorakhpur. One late 17th-century rajput chief from the Azamgarh area, named Bikramajit Singh, a descendant of Gautam Rajputs of Mehnagar in pargana Nizamabad, converted to Islam. His sons and descendants went on to found communities, establish markets and construct improvements such as a canal connecting the Tons River with the Kol.

In the case of one Gautam family, from Nagar, the decision by the British East India Company to dispossess them in favour of another landholder was the cause of them joining in the Indian rebellion of 1857. This was in part a result of British policies that led to declining socio-economic fortunes and thus a reduction in their ability to construct favourable marriage alliances.

Note
Gautam Rajputs are one of the prominent Rajput clan and these should not be misunderstood with other castes such as Gautam Brahmins, Gautam Bhumihars, and other scheduled castes or scheduled tribes.

References

Further reading
 

Rajput clans of Uttar Pradesh
Rajput clans of Bihar